Por tu amor (English: For your love) is a Mexican telenovela produced by Angelli Nesma Medina for Televisa in 1999.

Gabriela Spanic and Saúl Lisazo starred as protagonists, while Katie Barberi, Mauricio Aspe, Claudio Báez and Gerardo Albarrán starred as antagonists. Gerardo Murguía, Roberto Vander and Margarita Magaña starred as stellar performances.

Plot

The residences of little coast town San Carlos are living peacefully, until the arrival of the rich, mysterious man Marco Duran (Saul Lizaso).

Marco's presence will awake old stories and burn big passions.

Maria del Cielo (Gabriela Spanic) is a pretty girl that easily captured Marco's interest. He sees in her the girl he had always dreamed about.

On the other hand, Maria del Cielo sees him 
as nothing but an intruder.

Cielo is a very proud girl. She lives with her father, Nicolas, her grandmother, Paz and her sister Brisa (Margarita Mangana). She took the role of her mother to Brisa since they have lost their mom when they were just little girls.

Cielo is engaged to a town doctor, Sergio Zambrano (Gerardo Murguia).

During the wedding preparations, she learned that Sergio has fallen under the influence of her sister Brisa and that he spent a wild passionate night on a beach with her.

To keep the good family name, Cielo sacrificed her love. She broke up her engagement to Sergio and forced him to marry her sister Brisa instead.

Towards Marco, Cielo shows nothing but despise and contempt, she is not aware that slowly, she started to fall in love with him.

Marco doesn't know his biological roots; he grew up as an orphan and that left big trails in his life. But, in spite of that, with his persistence, he made big fortune. In front of Cielo, he acts like a bastard, without any manners and education. Even when he is in love with Cielo; he has his long time mistress, Miranda (Katie Barberi).

Miranda is a young adventuress, who is capable of doing everything to have Marco marry her. The big part in San Carlos belongs to Raquel and a secret she thought was buried deep in the past. Meanwhile, Sergio is unhappy with his own marriage, he comes to bother Cielo all the time. To counter, Cielo accepted Marco's marriage proposal.

Now, there are a lot of things working against Marco and Cielo and Miranda comes with a vengeance to take what she thought belonged to her.

History
On Monday, May 31, 1999, Canal de las Estrellas started broadcasting Por tu amor weekdays at 8:00pm, replacing Nunca te olvidaré. The last episode was broadcast on Friday, October 1, 1999 with Laberintos de pasión replacing it on Monday, October 4, 1999.

From Monday, May 8, 2000 to Friday, September 15, 2000, Univisión broadcast Por tu amor weeknights at 7pm/6c, replacing Soñadoras. The last episode was broadcast on Friday, September 15, 2000 at 7pm/6c, with Locura de amor replacing it on Monday, September 18, 2000.

From Tuesday, July 24, 2001 to Saturday, December 1, 2001, Galavisión broadcast Por tu amor every Tuesday to Saturday mornings at 5am/4c, replacing Marisol. The last episode was broadcast on Saturday, December 1, 2001 at 5am/4c, with Mujeres engañadas replacing it on Tuesday, December 4, 2001.

Cast
 
 Gabriela Spanic as María del Cielo "Cielo" Montalvo Arizmendi de Durán/Aurora Arizmendi de Montalvo
 Saúl Lisazo as Marco Durán
 Katie Barberi as Miranda Narváez de Durán
 Gerardo Murguía as Dr. Sergio Zambrano
 Roberto Vander as Nicolás Montalvo Gallardo
 Irán Eory as Paz "Mamá Paz" Gallardo Vda. de Montalvo
 Margarita Magaña as Brisa Montalvo Arizmendi de Zambrano
 Joaquín Cordero as Lázaro Robledo
 Lourdes Munguía as Alma Ledesma de Higueras/Mayra Rivas
 Alfonso Iturralde as Rafael Luévano
 Norma Lazareno as Adelaida Vda. de Zambrano
 Mauricio Aspe as René Higueras Ledesma
 Aitor Iturrioz as Agustín Higueras Ledesma
 Adriana Nieto as Abigaíl Parra/Abigaíl Durán Parra
 Claudio Báez as Luciano Higueras
 Jorge Poza as David Parra
 Yadira Santana as Raquel Parra
 Roberto Ballesteros as Sandro Valle
 Isaura Espinoza as Alejandra Avellán de Robledo
 Gabriela Goldsmith as Sonia Narváez
 Lourdes Reyes as María Fernanda "Marifé" Cifuentes Álvarez
 Guillermo Aguilar as Father Ponciano
 Gerardo Albarrán as Julián Leyva
 Sergio Sánchez as Don Eliseo Cifuentes
 Maleni Morales as Carlota Álvarez de Cifuentes
 Carlos Monden as Arquitecto Leoncio Ariza
 Graciela Estrada as Petra
 Daniel Gauvry as Mauricio Torres
 Rosita Bouchot as Azucena
 Melba Luna as Hilaria
 Vicky Rodel as Olga
 Pilar Escalante as Hilda
 Ramiro Torres as Jesús Cifuentes Álvarez
 Irma Torres as Bruja
 Liza Willert as Roxana
 Marlene Favela as Mónica
 Gustavo Negrete as Arquitecto Monroy
 José Antonio Estrada as Fausto
 Javier Ortiz as Pablo
 Claudia Palacios as Rosalba
 Carlos Bracho as Luévano
 Fátima Torre as Flor
 Polly as Pilar
 Patricia Martínez as Josefina
 Raquel Pankowsky as Dra. Obregón
 Rodolfo Lago as Juez Pereyra
 Eduardo Liñán as Lic. Medina
 Servando Manzetti as Álvaro
 Justo Martínez as Guillén
 Pedro Romo as Rubalcaba
 Alejandro Rábago as Lic. Alcalá
 Raúl Valerio as Don Rigoberto
 Rocío Yaber as Ximena Salazar
 Ingrid Martz as Paz Gallardo (young)
 Mario Garballido as Arquitecto Leoncio Ariza (young)
 Grettel Valdez as Alejandra Avellán (young)
 Javier Herranz as Lazaro Robledo (young)
 Ricardo Chávez as Theater actor
 Roger Cudney as Doctor
 Omar Ayala as Sailor
 José Luis Montemayor as Pablo's friend

Awards

References

External links

1999 telenovelas
Mexican telenovelas
1999 Mexican television series debuts
1999 Mexican television series endings
Spanish-language telenovelas
Television shows set in Mexico City
Televisa telenovelas